Abdullah Hussain, (14 August 1931 – 4 July 2015) was an Urdu novelist and short story writer from Rawalpindi.

Personal life
His ancestors migrated from Bannu to Punjab. His father worked as excise inspector and went to be farmer later on. Abdullah was his only and youngest son of three other children. His mother died when Abdullah was only six months old. His father was super protective about him. He preferred Abdullah to be with him in his free times. Reflection of this bond is often seen in his writings as well.

Literary career 
Abdullah Hussain shot into fame with his novel Udaas Naslainاُداس نسلیں. He was awarded the Adamjee Literary Award for this debut novel. Udaas Naslain اُداس نسلیں is considered as a milestone in Urdu literature. It is a story of a common man who entered into elite class by marriage but is not able to cope with it and eventually returns.

He also wrote Baagh باگھ in 1982, which focuses on Kashmir liberation. Baagh (A Lion) is a symbol of terror to everyone. His 1989 novel 'Qaid' (prison) is a story of a newborn who was murdered in Karachi. 'Raat' published in 1994 was also his novel of same genre.
Later he wrote Nadar Log  نادارلوگ in 1996 which is based on 1971 war between India and Pakistan. Novel focuses on Sarfraz's story who was appointed in east Pakistan and went on to be a prisoner of war and reveals the causes behind the Dhaka fall. He has also written collections of short stories Nashaib نشیب and 'faraib' فریب, and a novel in English about Afghan jihad.

Among his works, the novelette "Raat " has been translated into Persian by Samira Gilani.

Death 
He had been suffering from blood cancer for several years. He was taken to the National Defence Hospital after his condition deteriorated. Later, he was brought back to his home where he died on 4 July 2015.

Literary works 

 Udaas Naslain (Novel) 
 Nadaar Log (Novel)
 Baagh (Novel)
 Qyd (Novella)
 Raat (Novella)
 Wapasi Ka Safar (Novel)
 Nashaib (Collection of Short stories)
 Faraib (collection of short stories)

References

 
 
 http://tribune.com.pk/story/916565/abdullah-hussain-alive-in-his-vision/
 

1931 births
2015 deaths
Urdu-language short story writers
Pakistani male short story writers
Pakistani translators
20th-century novelists
Pashtun people
Urdu-language novelists
Pakistani novelists
Writers from Lahore
20th-century Pakistani short story writers
20th-century Pakistani male writers
Recipients of the Adamjee Literary Award
20th-century translators